Sambuca is an Italian anise-flavoured, usually colourless, liqueur. Its most common variety is often referred to as white sambuca to differentiate it from other varieties that are deep blue (black sambuca) or bright red (red sambuca). Like other anise-flavoured liqueurs, the ouzo effect is sometimes observed when combined with water.

Ingredients
Sambuca is flavoured with essential oils obtained from star anise, or less commonly, green anise. Other spices such as elderflower, liquorice and others may be included but are not required as per the legal definition. It is bottled at a minimum of 38% alcohol by volume. The oils are added to pure alcohol, a concentrated solution of sugar, and other flavourings.

History
The term comes from the Latin word sambucus, meaning "elderberry". The word sambuca was first used as the name of another elderberry liquor that was created in Civitavecchia around 1850 by Luigi Manzi.

Serving
Sambuca may be served neat. It may also be served on the rocks or with water, resulting in the ouzo effect from the anethole in the anise. Like other anise liqueurs, it may be consumed after coffee as an ammazzacaffè or added directly to coffee in place of sugar to produce a caffè corretto.

A serving of sambuca can be a shot with seven coffee beans, representing the seven hills of Rome. Likewise, a shot with one coffee bean, called con la mosca, which means "with the fly", is as common. The traditional serving is with three coffee beans, each representing health, happiness and prosperity. The shot may be ignited to toast the coffee beans with the flame extinguished immediately before drinking.

Sambuca is also used in cooking, in small amounts because it has a strong flavor. It is usually used in desserts and seafood recipes.

See also
List of anise-flavored liqueurs
List of cocktails

References

External links 
 
 

Anise liqueurs and spirits
Italian liqueurs
Shooters (drinks)